Cynthia Dinah Kinser (born December 20, 1951) is a Virginia lawyer who served as the chief justice of the Supreme Court of Virginia.  Justice Kinser was elected by the Virginia General Assembly to her first 12-year term to the Virginia Supreme Court in 1998, after being appointed by Governor George Allen to fill a 1997 vacancy.  Justice Kinser was elected to a second 12-year term during the 2010 session of the General Assembly.  Justice Kinser became Chief Justice of the Virginia Supreme Court on February 1, 2011.  She is the first woman to hold the office of Chief Justice on the Court.

Biography
Justice Kinser received her bachelor's degree with honors from the University of Tennessee in 1974, and her law degree from the University of Virginia in 1977.  Prior to being appointed to the Supreme Court by then-Governor George Felix Allen, Kinser served, along with Allen, as law clerk to U.S. District Judge Glen M. Williams, Western District of Virginia from 1977 to 1978.  Allen and Kinser had also been law school classmates.  She then entered lawyer private practice from 1978 to 1979 and served as Commonwealth's Attorney for Lee County, Virginia from 1980 to 1984.  She returned to private practice from 1984 to 1990.  She served as a U.S. magistrate judge, Western District of Virginia from 1990 to 1997. She succeeded Justice Roscoe B. Stephenson Jr.

At the ceremony announcing her appointment, Governor Allen said of Justice Kinser, "She believes the purpose of judges is to interpret law, not to make it."  Kinser, in her remarks, responded, "It is for the legislature to pass laws and, as a judge, it is not for me to agree or disagree but to apply the law to the facts of a case."  Following news of her appointment, Clifton "Chip" Woodrum, a Democratic member of the Virginia House of Delegates, said that, though he was not familiar with Kinser's credentials. "Given the source, I would assume that she's no screaming liberal, and that she reflects Governor Allen's point of view."

According to news reports at the time of her appointment, Kinser's motto is "To make the best better" from 4-H, the youth agricultural organization in which she was active.

Kinser retired from the Supreme Court at the end of 2014.

On May 5, 2015, Kinser began a position as senior counsel with the Roanoke-based law firm Gentry Locke Rakes & Moore, LLP. At Gentry Locke, Justice Kinser will focus on appeals, criminal matters, and government investigations.

See also
List of female state supreme court justices

References

1951 births
Living people
Justices of the Supreme Court of Virginia
County and city Commonwealth's Attorneys in Virginia
Virginia state court judges
University of Tennessee alumni
University of Virginia School of Law alumni
Women in Virginia politics
American women judges
Chief Justices of the Supreme Court of Virginia
Women chief justices of state supreme courts in the United States
People from Pennington Gap, Virginia
United States magistrate judges
21st-century American women
20th-century American women judges
20th-century American judges
21st-century American women judges
21st-century American judges